The Rash is an epithet which may refer to:

Charles the Bold or the Rash (1433–1477), Duke of Burgundy
James III of Majorca (1315–1349), King of Majorca from 1324 to 1344
Stephen I, Count of Burgundy (1065–1102)
William I, Count of Burgundy (1020–1087), father of Stephen I

Lists of people by epithet